Woon-jung "Chella" Choi (born 25 August 1990) is a South Korean professional golfer.

Choi played on the Duramed Futures Tour in 2008 with a best finish of T-2 at the Bright House Networks Open. She earned her 2009 LPGA Tour card at LPGA Final Qualifying Tournament, having to earn her card through a playoff.

Her first professional victory came on 19 July 2015, at the LPGA Tour's Marathon Classic, where she defeated Jang Ha-na in a playoff. The win happened after seven years and 157 LPGA Tour events. For the first eight years of Choi's professional career, her father was her caddie and vowed to remain until she won.

Professional wins (1)

LPGA Tour (1)

LPGA Tour playoff record (1–1)

Results in LPGA majors
Results not in chronological order before 2019.

^ The Evian Championship was added as a major in 2013

CUT = missed the half-way cut
NT = no tournament
T = tied

Summary

Most consecutive cuts made – 11 (2015 WPGA – 2017 WPGA)
Longest streak of top-10s – 2 (2013 WPGA – 2013 Evian)

References

External links

South Korean female golfers
LPGA Tour golfers
Golfers from Jacksonville, Florida
Sportspeople from Daegu
1990 births
Living people
20th-century South Korean women
21st-century South Korean women